The Constitutional Court of Saxony is the constitutional court of Saxony. The court has its seat in Leipzig and is opposite of the Federal Administrative Court building.

History 
The constitutional court was formed on 18 February 1993, when the Landtag of Saxony determined the seat of the court in Leipzig.

Former presidents of the court 
 Günter Hirsch (1993–1995)
 Thomas Pfeiffer (1995–2005)
 Klaus Budewig (2005-2007)
 Birgit Munz (2007-2020)
 Matthias Grünberg (since 2020)

References 

Leipzig
State constitutions of Germany
Courts and tribunals established in 1993
Courts in Germany
Organisations based in Leipzig